Alagirsky District (Alagiry rajon) is an administrative and municipal district (raion), one of the eight in the Republic of North Ossetia–Alania, Russia. It is located in the central and southern parts of the republic along the Russian border with South Ossetia/Georgia. Its administrative center is the town of Alagir. Population:  38,581 (2002 Census);  The population of Alagir accounts for 54.0% of the district's total population.

Geography and tourism
A major part of the district is located in the mountainous part of the republic. Tsey ski resort is located in the district.

Villages and settlements
Abaytikau

References

Notes

Sources

Districts of North Ossetia–Alania
